The Peter Porter Poetry Prize is an ongoing international literary award run by the Australian Book Review for outstanding poetry. Established by the ABR in 2005, the Prize is named after the late Australian poet Peter Porter. The Porter Prize, awarded annually by the ABR, is considered 'one of Australia’s most lucrative and respected awards for poetry' and among the country's 'most prestigious prizes for a new poem'.  It 'guarantees winners wide exposure through publication in ABR'''  and in 2017 received 'nearly 1000 entries from twenty-two countries'.  

 History 
The Porter Prize was established in 2005 by the Australian Book Review. Formerly known as the ABR'' Poetry Prize, it was renamed the Peter Porter Poetry Prize in 2010 in honour of the famed Australian poet. The award is open to all poets writing in English, regardless of where they reside.

Winners 
Since its inception, there have been 19 winners of the Peter Porter Poetry Prize.
 2005: Stephen Edgar
 2006: Judith Bishop
 2007: Alex Skovron
 2008: Ross Clark
 2009: Tracy Ryan
 2010: Anthony Lawrence
 2011: Judith Bishop and Tony Lintermans (joint winners)
 2012: Michael Farrell
 2013: John A. Scott
 2014: Jessica L. Wilkinson
 2015: Judith Beveridge
 2016: Amanda Joy
 2017: Louis Klee and Damen O'Brien (joint winners)
2018: Nicholas Wong
2019: Andy Kissane and Belle Ling (joint winners)
2020: A. Frances Johnson
2021: Sara M Saleh
2022: Anthony Lawrence
2023: Dan Disney

References

External links 

 

Australian poetry awards
Awards established in 2005
2005 establishments in Australia